+972 Magazine is a  left-wing news and opinion  webzine established in August 2010 by a group of four Israeli writers in Tel Aviv. Noam Sheizaf, a co-founder and the +972 chief executive officer, said they wanted to express a new "and mostly young voice which would take part in the international debate regarding Israel and Palestine". They named the website in reference to the 972 international dialing code, which is shared by Israel and the Palestinian territories. The articles are written mostly in English to reach an international audience.

History, goals, management structure
+972 was founded in August 2010 by Lisa Goldman, Ami Kaufman, Dimi Reider, and Noam Sheizaf, four working journalists in Tel Aviv who met and decided to create a shared internet platform; they already each had blogs and shared progressive views, including opposition to Israel's occupation of the Palestinian territories. Sarah Wildman, writing in The Nation, described +972 as
"Born in the summer of 2010 as an umbrella outfit for a group of (mostly) pre-existing blogs. ... The site is now an online home for more than a dozen writers, a mix of Israelis, binational American- and Canadian-Israelis, and two Palestinians, all of whom occupy, if you'll forgive the term, space on the spectrum of the left."By January 2012 about 15 journalists were affiliated with +972, and most wrote in English for a largely American audience.

+972 has a horizontal, collaborative organizational structure. Proposed new members are "voted on by the group and can be rejected". The collaborative hires and fires the editor, who does not have authority to hire or fire members.

The website has an "unorthodox journalistic ethos: All the website's bloggers have complete freedom to write whenever and whatever they want". According to The Nation, editors do not make assignments:
"There is no hierarchy. Two rotating editors [recently changed to one editor] copy-edit and do a light legal sweep on each story. ... If they see something that needs to be changed for legal reasons, they'll notify the writer before making the change."

According to Liel Leibovitz, "the magazine's reported pieces ... adhere to sound journalistic practices of news gathering and unbiased reporting." Its commentary and essays, like its members, are dedicated "to promoting a progressive worldview of Israeli politics, advocating an end to the Israeli occupation of the West Bank, and protecting human and civil rights in Israel and Palestine"; they "support specific causes and are aimed at social and political change". Sarah Wildman, writing in The Nation in early 2012, says the magazine is "purposefully, uniformly progressive".

According to Leibovitz, +972 reporters are well-positioned to report from the West Bank. Several members of the cooperative are "frequent participants in joint Israeli-Palestinian demonstrations behind the Green Line", and work closely with "the activists who coordinate such protests".

Funding
The magazine is largely financed by reader contributions. In addition, the Heinrich Böll Foundation, a German think-tank affiliated with the German Green Party, provided 6,000 euros in first-year funding in 2010.
It continues to provide some funds. According to The Nation, the Social Justice Fund at the New Israel Fund granted +972 $10,000 in the first year, and made a one-year grant of $60,000 in early 2012.

Readers
The website's staff state that the vast majority of +972s readers live outside Israel, with about 40% in the United States and 20% in the Palestinian territories. According to CEO Noam Sheizaf, about 20% of its readers are Israeli. Israeli leftists Akiva Eldar and Merav Michaeli told The Nation that Israelis have never heard of +972, Michaeli describing it as simply "not relevant" to Israeli politics.

Reception

According to The Nation, writers for the left-wing newspaper Haaretz and left-wing Israeli intellectuals have criticized the new web magazine.

The pro-Israel organization NGO Monitor accused +972 of being antisemitic for applying the apartheid analogy regarding Israel's treatment of Palestinians. 

Noam Sheizaf said: "The attack on +972 is being carried out in the standard way NGO Monitor, Im Tirzu and similar organizations work these days: Not by debating the content of our reports and commentary pieces, but by trying to delegitimize and silence us." In February 2012, Sheizaf said "Jewish American liberals are not on our side. [Most Americans] will only support my liberalism to a certain degree. When I fight for the right of an Arab woman to become a doctor, you will stand by and donate to the New Israel Fund. But if I say 'Jerusalem is an apartheid city,' which it is—Jerusalem is the worst place in the world in terms of citizenship laws—American liberals get goosebumps."

Notable journalists 

 Basel Adra

References

External links
 

Israeli political websites
Left-wing politics in Israel
Mass media in Tel Aviv
Non-Hebrew-language mass media in Israel